Abraham Wayo (born 1 August 2003) is a Ghanaian footballer who currently plays as a midfielder for Tunisian Ligue Professionnelle 1 club Étoile Sportive du Sahel. He previously played for Ghana Premier League side Liberty Professionals F.C.

Career

Liberty Professionals 
Wayo started his career with Liberty Professionals in October 2019. He made his debut on 29 December 2019, after coming on at half time for Ernest Mwankurinah in a 2–2 draw against Legon Cities. At the end of the 2020–21 season, he scored 7 goals and made 7 assists in 32 league appearances and also won three man of the match awards in the process, ending the season as the club's top goal scorer. With Liberty Professional's failure to maintain in the top flight league due to being relegated to the Ghana Division One League, he was linked with a move to  Premier League sides Asante Kotoko and Hearts of Oak.

Étoile du Sahel 
On 30 August 2021, Wayo joined Tunisian club Étoile Sportive du Sahel on a four-year contract until 2025.

References

External links 

 

Living people
2003 births
Association football midfielders
Ghanaian footballers
Liberty Professionals F.C. players
Ghana Premier League players
Étoile Sportive du Sahel players
Ghanaian expatriate footballers
Ghanaian expatriate sportspeople in Tunisia
Expatriate footballers in Tunisia
Tunisian Ligue Professionnelle 1 players